Boadicea, Queen of Britain is a 1697 tragedy by the English writer Charles Hopkins. Based on the story of Boudica the British ruler who revolved against Roman Rule, it was first staged by Thomas Betterton's company at the Lincoln's Inn Fields Theatre in London.

The original Lincoln's Inn Fields cast included Elizabeth Barry as Boadicea, Anne Bracegirdle as Camilla, Elizabeth Bowman as Venutia, Thomas Betterton as Cassibelan, Edward Kynaston as Paulinus, John Hodgson as Decius, John Freeman as Fabian and Samuel Sandford as Caska.

References

Bibliography
 Van Lennep, W. The London Stage, 1660-1800: Volume One, 1660-1700. Southern Illinois University Press, 1960.

1697 plays
West End plays
Tragedy plays
Plays by Charles Hopkins